Advan Kadušić (born 14 October 1997) is a Bosnian professional footballer who plays as a right-back for Slovenian PrvaLiga club Istra 1961 and the Bosnia and Herzegovina national team.

Kadušić started his professional career at Sarajevo, before joining Zrinjski Mostar in 2017. Three years later, he moved to Celje.

A former youth international for Bosnia and Herzegovina, Kadušić made his senior international debut in 2020.

Club career

Early career
Kadušić started playing football at his local club Omladinac Sanica, and later at Krajina Cazin, before joining Sarajevo's youth academy in 2013. He made his professional debut against Velež on 18 October 2015 at the age of 18. On 10 August 2016, he scored his first professional goal against Krupa, which secured the victory for his team.

In December 2017, Kadušić switched to Zrinjski Mostar.

In January 2020, he moved to Slovenian side Celje. Kadušić left the club in January 2022, with his contract having been terminated by mutual consent. With Celje, Kadušić won the club's first national title, and in his two years at the club, played in 61 matches.

In July 2022, Kadušić joined NK Istra 1961 in Croatia.

International career
Kadušić represented Bosnia and Herzegovina at all youth levels.

In September 2020, he received his first senior call-up, for UEFA Euro 2020 qualifying play-offs against Northern Ireland and 2020–21 UEFA Nations League games against Netherlands and Poland. He debuted against Netherlands on 11 October.

Career statistics

Club

International

Honours
Zrinjski Mostar
Bosnian Premier League: 2017–18

Celje
Slovenian PrvaLiga: 2019–20

References

External links

1997 births
Living people
Sportspeople from Zenica
Bosniaks of Bosnia and Herzegovina
Bosnia and Herzegovina Muslims
Bosnia and Herzegovina footballers
Bosnia and Herzegovina youth international footballers
Bosnia and Herzegovina under-21 international footballers
Bosnia and Herzegovina international footballers
Bosnia and Herzegovina expatriate footballers
Association football fullbacks
FK Sarajevo players
HŠK Zrinjski Mostar players
NK Celje players
Premier League of Bosnia and Herzegovina players
Slovenian PrvaLiga players
Expatriate footballers in Slovenia
Bosnia and Herzegovina expatriate sportspeople in Slovenia